Alexander Sergeyevich Korovin (born 15 February 1994) is a Russian pair skater. As of October 2022, he competes with Isabella Gamez for the Philippines.

Earlier in his career, he represented Russia with Alisa Efimova. The pair won one Grand Prix medal, silver at the 2018 Skate America, and five medals on the ISU Challenger Series, including gold at the 2018 CS Nebelhorn Trophy and 2018 CS Golden Spin of Zagreb.

Personal life 
Korovin was born in Pervouralsk, Russia.

Career

Early years 
Korovin began learning to skate in 1999. He switched from single skating to pairs in 2010. Competing with his first partner, Alexandra Minina, he placed ninth at the 2013 Russian Junior Championships. He teamed up with Alisa Efimova in 2014. Their international debut came in February 2016 at the Hellmut Seibt Memorial. They won the silver medal, finishing second to Italy's Valentina Marchei / Ondřej Hotárek.

2016–2017 season 
Coached by Natalia Pavlova and Alexander Zaitsev in Moscow, Efimova/Korovin debuted on the Grand Prix series, placing seventh at the 2016 Rostelecom Cup in November. Later that month, the two received the silver medal at the 2016 CS Tallinn Trophy, having ranked second in the short program, first in the free skate, and second overall behind Alina Ustimkina / Nikita Volodin of Russia. After placing eighth at the 2017 Russian Championships, they took silver at the Cup of Tyrol in March 2017.

2017–2018 season 
Efimova/Korovin relocated to Saint Petersburg to be coached by Oleg Vasiliev and Tamara Moskvina. In September, the pair placed fifth at their season opener, the 2017 CS Lombardia Trophy and then won bronze at the 2017 CS Ondrej Nepela Trophy a week later. In November, they took silver at the 2017 CS Tallinn Trophy behind Australia's Ekaterina Alexandrovskaya / Harley Windsor. They had no Grand Prix assignments. They finished ninth at the 2018 Russian Championships.

2018–2019 season 
In September, Efimova/Korovin won their first international gold medal at their first event of the season, the 2018 CS Nebelhorn Trophy. Ranked fourth in the short program and first in the free skate, they outscored the silver medalists, Alexa Scimeca Knierim / Chris Knierim, by 1.72 points.

Efimova/Korovin competed at two Grand Prix events, the 2018 Skate America and 2018 Rostelecom Cup. In October, Efimova/Korovin won their first Grand Prix medal, silver, at the 2018 Skate America. Ranked second in the short program and third in the free skate, they won the silver medal behind their teammates Evgenia Tarasova / Vladimir Morozov. In mid-November, they competed at the 2018 Rostelecom Cup, where they finished fifth after placing fourth in the short program and fifth in the free skate.

In early December, Efimova/Korovin won their second Challenger Series gold medal of the season at the 2018 CS Golden Spin of Zagreb. Ranked first in the short program and second in the free skate, they again narrowly beat Alexa Scimeca Knierim / Chris Knierim. This time Efimova/Korovin beat them by 1.05 points. Efimova/Korovin scored their best score of 183.89 points at this event.

At the 2019 Russian Championships, Efimova/Korovin placed sixth.

2019–2020 season 
Beginning the season on the Challenger series, Efimova/Korovin were seventh at the 2019 CS Nebelhorn Trophy, then won the silver medal at the 2019 CS Finlandia Trophy.  They finished eighth of eight teams at the 2019 Cup of China.  They placed fourth at the 2019 NHK Trophy.

At the 2020 Russian Championships, Efimova/Korovin placed fourth in the short program.  The free skate was a struggle, with them placing tenth in that segment and dropping to ninth place overall. It was announced afterward that they had split.

2020–2021 & 2021–2022 seasons 
Korovin did not compete during the 2020–2021 and 2021–2022 seasons as he awaited his release from the Figure Skating Federation of Russia. In August 2021, it was announced that he had teamed up with Filipina skater Isabella Gamez and that the two would be competing for the Philippines. Gamez and Korovin met and began training together in Florida in early 2021. For the 2021–2022 season, Gamez and Korovin focused on their training at Hertz Arena with Coach Marina Zoueva and her team in Estero, Florida.

2022-2023 season 
The Korovin/Gamez pair made their debut at the 2022 CS Finlandia Trophy, where they placed ninth after two years of inactivity. In their second competition together, Gamez and Korovin achieved a historical milestone for the Philippines. They won the first-ever medal for Philippine pairs skating in an international competition, a silver medal at the Trophée Métropole Nice Côte d’Azur in Nice, France. They also qualified for the 2023 Four Continents Championships.

Programs

With Gamez

With Efimova

Competitive highlights 
GP: Grand Prix; CS: Challenger Series

With Gamez for the Philippines

With Efimova for Russia

With Minina

Detailed results 
With Gamez for the Phillipines

With Efimova for Russia

References

External links 

 

1994 births
Russian male pair skaters
Living people
People from Pervouralsk
Figure skaters from Moscow
Universiade gold medalists for Russia
Universiade medalists in figure skating
Competitors at the 2019 Winter Universiade
Filipino male pair skaters